Carronella pellucida is a species of sea slug, an aeolid nudibranch, a marine heterobranch mollusc in the family Flabellinidae.

Description
Carronella pellucida has a translucent white body and opaque white pigment on the tips of the rhinophores, oral tentacles and cerata.

The maximum recorded body length is 30 mm or up to 40 mm.

Distribution
This species was described from a single specimen collected from deep water, off Cullercoats, England, North Sea. It has a northerly distribution in the UK, being found most regularly in Scotland.

Ecology 
Minimum recorded depth is 0 m. Maximum recorded depth is 20 m.
This species usually feeds on Eudendrium arbuscula, a hydroid in the family Eudendriidae.

References

Flabellinidae
Gastropods described in 1843